WQPX-TV (channel 64) is a television station licensed to Scranton, Pennsylvania, United States, broadcasting the Ion Television network to Northeastern Pennsylvania. Owned and operated by the Ion Media subsidiary of the E. W. Scripps Company, the station has offices on Lackawanna Avenue in downtown Scranton, and its transmitter is located on Bald Mountain, northwest of Scranton and I-476.

WQPX-TV operates a digital replacement translator on UHF channel 49 that is licensed to Waymart with a transmitter in Forest City. It exists because wind turbines run by NextEra Energy Resources at the Waymart Wind Farm interfere with the transmission of full-power television signals.

History
WQPX began broadcasting May 18, 1998 with test broadcasts; the official sign on took place June 1. Before WQPX signed on, the station's call sign was WSWB-TV, first used on channel 38 in the early 1980s (before its own sign-on) and currently used on that same station today. WSWB initially planned to sign on in July 1997, but delayed its launch so that it could construct a 5,000,000-watt signal to increase its must carry reach. Initially, WQPX aired Paxson's InfoMall format of infomercials and religious programming; on August 31, 1998, the station became one of the launch stations for Pax TV (the forerunner to Ion).

On October 5, 1998, WQPX added a secondary affiliation with UPN as part of a group deal between Paxson Communications and UPN; the network's programming aired in late night, following Pax's prime time lineup. UPN programming had previously aired in weekend late night timeslots on CBS affiliate WYOU (channel 22). WQPX dropped UPN in 1999.

From 2001 to 2005, WQPX aired rebroadcasts of newscasts from ABC affiliate WNEP-TV (channel 16); WNEP's owner, The New York Times Company, also took over WQPX's advertising sales through a joint sales agreement. The agreement was reached in October 2000 after negotiations with NBC affiliate WBRE-TV (channel 28) fell through; the arrangement with WNEP ended on June 30, 2005, after Paxson Communications terminated all joint sales agreements involving its stations.

Technical information

Subchannels 
The station's digital signal is multiplexed:

Analog-to-digital conversion
WQPX-TV shut down its analog signal, over UHF channel 64, on June 12, 2009, the official date in which full-power television stations in the United States transitioned from analog to digital broadcasts under federal mandate. The station's digital signal remained on its pre-transition UHF channel 32. Through the use of PSIP, digital television receivers display the station's virtual channel as its former UHF analog channel 64, which was among the high band UHF channels (52-69) that were removed from broadcasting use as a result of the transition.

References

External links 

Ion Television affiliates
Bounce TV affiliates
Court TV affiliates
Grit (TV network) affiliates
Defy TV affiliates
TrueReal affiliates
Scripps News affiliates
E. W. Scripps Company television stations
Television channels and stations established in 1998
1998 establishments in Pennsylvania
QPX-TV